Alexander Massie (13 March 1906 – 1977) was a Scottish footballer of the 1920s and 1930s, who played mainly as a right-half. He played for various Scottish clubs before joining Bury. After spells in the United States and Ireland, Massie returned to Scottish football in 1930 with Heart of Midlothian. His performances there earned him selection for the Scotland national football team and the Scottish League XI. Massie moved to Aston Villa in 1935. After retiring as a player in 1945, Massie became the manager of Aston Villa. He later managed Torquay United and Hereford United.

Player
Massie was born in Possilpark, Glasgow, to William Spiers Massie, a weighing clerk, and Violet Shaw Massie. He began his career with Shawfield Juniors, and later played for Petershill, Benburb, Ashfield, and Ayr United before joining Football League side Bury in January 1927.

In 1928, he left Gigg Lane to play in the United States for Bethlehem Steel, supporting himself as a bookkeeper, and in 1930 he joined Irish side Dolphin. Later that year he returned to his native Scotland to join Heart of Midlothian. His performances at wing-half, and occasionally at inside-forward soon won him international recognition, with his first full Scotland international cap coming on 19 September 1931 against Ireland. Massie went on to be capped 18 times for Scotland, with his final game coming on 30 October 1937 against Wales, which was also the occasion of his only international goal. He also played in an unofficial 'King's Silver Jubilee' international in 1935 and represented the Scottish League XI.

Massie moved to Aston Villa in December 1935, but was unable to prevent their first ever relegation at the end of the 1935–36 season. He was still with the Villains when they gained promotion back to the top division two years later.

Manager
Massie retired from playing at end of the 1944–45 wartime season; he was appointed manager of Aston Villa in August 1945 and led them to top ten finishes in his first three seasons and twelfth place the following year, despite not having complete control of the playing side of things at Villa Park. However, in August 1950 he left the club.

In 1950 he was appointed as manager of Torquay United as successor to Bob John, although he only remained as manager until 1951.

He returned to management with Hereford United the following January, where he remained as manager until December 1952. He later managed Hertford Town and Welwyn Garden City the later in which he won the South Midlands League Premier Division in 1972–73.

Honours
Aston Villa
 Football League Second Division: 1937–38 

Welwyn Garden City
South Midlands League Premier Division: 1972–73

See also	
List of Scotland national football team captains

References

 

1906 births
1977 deaths
Footballers from Glasgow
Scottish footballers
Scotland international footballers
English Football League players
American Soccer League (1921–1933) players
Eastern Professional Soccer League (1928–29) players
Shawfield F.C. players
Ashfield F.C. players
Benburb F.C. players
Ayr United F.C. players
Bury F.C. players
Bethlehem Steel F.C. (1907–1930) players
Heart of Midlothian F.C. players
Aston Villa F.C. players
Heart of Midlothian F.C. wartime guest players
Birmingham City F.C. wartime guest players
Notts County F.C. wartime guest players
Nottingham Forest F.C. wartime guest players
Scottish football managers
Aston Villa F.C. managers
Torquay United F.C. managers
Hereford United F.C. managers
Hertford Town F.C. managers
Welwyn Garden City F.C. managers
Petershill F.C. players
Scottish Football League players
Scottish Football League representative players
Association football wing halves
Scottish expatriate sportspeople in the United States
Scottish expatriate sportspeople in Ireland
Expatriate soccer players in the United States
Expatriate association footballers in the Republic of Ireland
Scottish expatriate footballers
Scottish Junior Football Association players
People from Possilpark
Dolphin F.C. players